The Canon EOS M10 is a digital mirrorless interchangeable-lens camera first announced by Canon Inc. on October 13, 2015.  It was replaced by the Canon EOS M100.

Design
The EOS M10 is an interchangeable lens camera that uses the Canon EF-M lens mount.  The EOS M10 is an entry-level model which lacks the large rubber grip, multiple control dials, and hot shoe flash that can be found on the larger and more expensive Canon EOS M3. 

The EOS M10 uses the same 18MP APS-C sensor as the older Canon EOS M2, which was not sold in the United States.  The EOS M10 also uses the EOS M2's Hybrid CMOS AF II autofocus system, instead of the EOS M3's quicker Hybrid CMOS AF III system. However, unlike the EOS M2, the EOS M10 features the same DIGIC 6 image processor as the newer EOS M3.

The EOS M10 has a 180-degree flip-up LCD viewscreen, a built-in pop-up flash, and integrated Wi-Fi and NFC enabling control of the camera via a smartphone app.

Sales
In its initial press release announcing the camera, Canon revealed that the camera would be sold in a kit including the EOS M10 and an EF-M 15-45mm f/3.5-6.3 IS STM zoom lens at a retail price of $599.99.  As of October 2015, the camera is not sold separately and can only be bought in a kit with lens included.

References

External links
Technical Specifications

Canon EF-M-mount cameras
Cameras introduced in 2015